Canton Liberal Football Club is a Welsh football team based in Canton, Cardiff, Wales. They play in the South Wales Alliance League Premier Division, which is in the fourth tier of the Welsh football league system.

History
The club was established in 2006, initially playing in the Cardiff & District League. In their first four seasons they won each divisional title. They were champions of the Premier Division in the 2012–13 season, joining the South Wales Amateur League Division Two, where they were champions in 2014–15.  They joined the newly formed South Wales Alliance League for the 2015–16 season, and were again league champions, gaining promotion to the Premier Division for the 2016–17 season.

Honours
South Wales Alliance League Division One: – Champions: 2015–16
South Wales Amateur League Division Two: – Champions: 2014–15
Cardiff & District League Premier Division: – Champions: 2012–13
Cardiff & District League Division One: – Champions: 2009–10
Cardiff & District League Division Two: – Champions: 2008–09
Cardiff & District League Division Three: – Champions: 2007–08
Cardiff & District League Division Four: – Champions: 2006–07

References

External links
Club official twitter
Club official facebook

Football clubs in Wales
South Wales Alliance League clubs
South Wales Amateur League clubs
Cardiff & District League clubs
Football clubs in Cardiff
Sport in Cardiff
Canton, Cardiff
2006 establishments in Wales
Association football clubs established in 2006